Désirée McGraw is a Canadian politician, who was elected to the National Assembly of Quebec in the 2022 Quebec general election. She represents the riding of Notre-Dame-de-Grâce as a member of the Quebec Liberal Party.

References

21st-century Canadian politicians
21st-century Canadian women politicians
Quebec Liberal Party MNAs
Women MNAs in Quebec
Politicians from Montreal
Living people
Year of birth missing (living people)